Selman is an unincorporated rural village in Harper County, Oklahoma, United States. It is the site of a highway department office and lot, a fire department, a grainery, and a scattering of small houses.

History
The first official auction of Selman town lots occurred in late April, 1920, although some lots were purchased, and some building erected, prior to this.  The townsite was originally the homestead of one J. B. Fesler.  Fesler sold it to J. O. Selman, and Selman sold it to the townsite company, which had it platted and named in Selman’s honor.  The town was in a wheat-growing area, and was quickly linked to Buffalo by rail to allow transport of wheat.  The post office was relocated from Charleston, Oklahoma after Selman was organized, but retained the name Charleston until September 21, 1923.  In the 1920s, Selman had a two-story school, a Methodist Episcopal Church, two groceries, a creamery, a café, a lumber & supply, a variety store, a hotel, a bank, and other businesses.

In the present-day, no rail lines remain anywhere in Harper County, and Selman is not located on any major highway, being south of US Route 64 off N1980 Rd.  The Oklahoma Public School District Directory shows Harper County schools only in Buffalo and Laverne.

Demographics
US Census population 2020 = 12.

References

Unincorporated communities in Harper County, Oklahoma
Unincorporated communities in Oklahoma